Parodomyiops is a genus of bristle flies in the family Tachinidae.

Species
Parodomyiops thelairodops Townsend, 1935

Distribution
Trinidad and Tobago, Guyana.

References

Monotypic Brachycera genera
Dexiinae
Diptera of North America
Diptera of South America
Tachinidae genera
Taxa named by Charles Henry Tyler Townsend